Retifusus iturupus is a species of sea snail, a marine gastropod mollusk in the family Retimohniidae, the true whelks and the like.

Description

Distribution

References

External links
  Kosyan A.R. & Kantor Y.I. (2014). Revision of the genus Retifusus Dall, 1916 (Gastropoda: Buccinidae). Ruthenica. 24(2): 129-172

Retimohniidae
Gastropods described in 1998